The Missile d’Interception, de Combat et d’Auto-défense (English: "Interception, Combat and Self-protection Missile") or MICA is a French anti-air multi-target, all weather, fire-and-forget short and medium-range missile system manufactured by MBDA France. It is intended for use both by air platforms as individual missiles as well as ground units and ships, which can be equipped with the rapid fire MICA Vertical Launch System. It is fitted with a thrust vector control (TVC) system. It was developed from 1982 onward by Matra. The first trials occurred in 1991, and the missile was commissioned in 1996 to equip the Rafale and Mirage 2000. It is a replacement for both the Super 530 in the interception role and the Magic II in the dogfighting role.

On 11 June 2007, a MICA launched from a Rafale successfully demonstrated its over-the-shoulder capability by destroying a target behind the launch aircraft. The target was designated by another aircraft and coordinates were transmitted by Link 16.

Characteristics
There are two MICA variants; MICA RF has an active radar homing seeker and MICA IR has an imaging infra-red homing seeker.  Both seekers are designed to filter out counter-measures such as chaff and decoy flares. A thrust vector control unit fitted to the rocket motor increases the missile's agility. The missile is capable of lock-on after launch (LOAL) which means it is capable of engaging targets outside its seeker's at-launch acquisition range. Mounted on the Rafale, the MICA IR can provide IR imagery to the central data processing system, thus acting as an extra sensor.

MICA can also be employed as a short-range surface-to-air missile. It is available in a ground-based version, VL MICA, fired from a truck-mounted box launcher, and a naval version, VL MICA-M, fired from a ship-fitted vertical launch system. On October 23, 2008, 15:30, at CELM, Biscarosse (Landes), a VL MICA missile successfully performed the last of its 14 test firings meaning it is now ready for mass production. The target drone was flying at low level, over the sea, 12 km away; despite this distance, MICA, equipped with an active radar seeker, locked on the target and shot it down.

Corvettes too small to have the big and costly Aster missile system are the most likely customers for the VL MICA-M, which offers similar capability as the Aster 15 but without its booster and PIF-PAF vectorial control.

While the VL MICA has an advertised range of 20 km, aerodynamic performance is significantly degraded at those ranges. From 0 to 7 km MICA has maneuverability of 50g, however by 12 km this is reduced to 30g as energy is lost.

Variants

 MICA RF
 MICA EM
 MICA IR
 VL MICA RF
 VL MICA IR
 VL MICA-M RF
 VL MICA-M IR
 MICA NG . Second generation of MICA designed against stealthy targets. Infrared seeker will use a matrix sensor providing greater sensitivity. The radio frequency seeker will use an AESA (Active Electronically Scanned Array).

Operators

Current operators
 
 Botswana Ground Force: VL MICA on erector launcher, acquired in 2016.
 
 Egyptian Air Force: MICA EM/IR used on Rafale aircraft.
 Egyptian Navy: VL MICA-M installed on Gowind-class corvettes.
 
 French Air Force: used on Mirage 2000-5, Mirage 2000D RMV and Rafale aircraft.
 French Navy: used on Rafale M aircraft and Barracuda-class submarine.
 
 Georgian Air Force: VL MICA along with Ground Master 200 and 400 radars from Thales Raytheon Systems.
 
 Hellenic Air Force: MICA EM/IR on Mirage 2000 and Rafale fighters.

 Indian Air Force: 200 MICA-IR and 1000 MICA-RF missiles are integrated on upgraded Mirage-2000s and Rafales. Indian Air Force successfully tested MICA missile from its aircraft Sukhoi Su-30MKI.
 Indian Navy: on Kalvari-class submarines.

 
 Royal Moroccan Army: Ground based VL MICA.
 Royal Moroccan Air Force
 Royal Moroccan Navy: VL MICA-M installed on Sigma-class design.
 
 Royal Navy of Oman: VL MICA-M used on the Khareef-class corvettes.
 
 Qatar Emiri Air Force
 
 Saudi Arabia National Guard Air Defence: VL-MICA.
 
 Republic of Singapore Navy: Independence-class littoral mission vessel is equipped with the VL MICA-M.
 
 Republic of China Air Force: 960 originally purchased to equip Mirage 2000-5 fighters of the RoCAF. The National Chung-Shan Institute of Science and Technology has been tasked with upgrading the missile in 2016.

Royal Thai Army: VL MICA on truck-mounted box launcher.
 
 United Arab Emirates Air Force: on the Mirage 2000.
 United Arab Emirates Navy: VL MICA-M on Falaj 2-class patrol vessel.

Future operators
 
 Royal Malaysian Navy: VL MICA-M has been selected to be installed on six Maharaja Lela-class frigates.
 
 Croatian Air Force: With the purchase of the Rafale F3R fighter jets come MICA missiles in radar-guided and infrared versions.
 
 Bulgarian Navy: In september 2022 bulgarian government decided for the purchase of VL MICA for the two future patrol ships of the Bulgarian Navy. The first ship is under construction and will be commissioned in 2025.
 
 Ukrainian Navy:  The VL "MIKA" air defense system will be installed on the "Ada" type corvette "Hetman Ivan Mazepa".

See also

 Air-to-air missile
 List of missiles
 A-Darter
 AIM-120 AMRAAM
 AIM-132 ASRAAM
 Astra (missile)
 CAMM
 Derby (missile)
 HİSAR
 IRIS-T
 PL-10
 QRSAM
 R-27
 R-73
 R-Darter
 Umkhonto

References

External links

 .

MICA
MICA
20th-century surface-to-air missiles
Military equipment introduced in the 1990s
Fire-and-forget weapons
Matra